Meljak is a suburban settlement of Belgrade, Serbia. It is located in the municipality of Barajevo.

It is located northeast of the municipal seat of Barajevo. It is a rural settlement and thanks to its location on the Ibarska magistrala (Highway of Ibar), one of the fastest growing in the municipality. It grew from a population of 1,307 (Census 1991) to 1,772 (Census 2002), with an average annual growth of 2.8%.

Meljak was part of the municipality of Umka which was abolished in 1960 and divided between the municipalities of Čukarica and Barajevo (Meljak and Vranić).

Demographics

References 

Suburbs of Belgrade
Barajevo